Godalming College is a sixth form college, situated in Godalming,  south-west of London and five miles from Guildford, Surrey. The college had been consistently oversubscribed in years prior to 2010. It is the successor to Godalming Grammar School, a state grammar school. The college retained its 'outstanding' Ofsted status in a December 2019 inspection.

Academic standings
In 2020, Godalming College had a 99.8% pass rate, 67.6% of exam entrants attained grades within the A* to B boundary. In the same year, 100 percent pass rates were achieved in all BTEC courses, with 67.2% of BTEC entrants attaining grades within the Distinction to Distinction* boundary.

Design Awards

In 2000, the newly completed building achieved the Best New Building Award in the Godalming Trust Civic Design Awards. Since then, three new blocks have been built, including a library block, sports hall and a performing arts building.

Societies
There is a Christian Union at Godalming, there is also a Debating Society, a Harry Potter Society, a Model UN Society, GCTV (a student media enterprise), Chess Club, Games Club and an LGBT society.

Notable alumni
 Annabelle Apsion, actress (Shameless)
 Rikki Clarke, England cricketer
 Ben Elton, comedian and writer.
 Alexandra Evans, winner of Britains Next Top Model Cycle 4
 Gabrielle Glaister, actress
 Victoria Hamilton, actress
 Isabel Hardman, journalist at The Spectator
 Rufus Hound, comedian and television presenter
 Rachel Hurd-Wood, actress
 Ingrid Lacey, actress (Drop the Dead Donkey)
 Andy Salmon, Commandant General Royal Marines
 Simon Shaw, rugby player
 Isaac Stanmore, actor
 Lucy Watson, socialite on Made In Chelsea
Max Bowden Actor

References

External links
 Godalming College

Learning and Skills Beacons
Sixth form colleges in Surrey
Godalming